Barranco de Loba is a town and municipality located in the Bolívar Department, northern Colombia.

Climate
Barranco de Loba has a tropical monsoon climate (Am) with moderate rainfall from December to March and heavy to very heavy rainfall from April to November.

External links
 Barranca de Loba official website

References

Municipalities of Bolívar Department